María Nieves y Bustamante (1871–1947) was a Peruvian writer.

1871 births
1947 deaths
Peruvian literature
Peruvian women writers
People from Arequipa